The Skin Game is a 1921 British-Dutch silent drama film adapted from the 1920 play by John Galsworthy and directed by B. E. Doxat-Pratt.

Edmund Gwenn and Helen Haye later reprised their respective roles as Mr. Hornblower and Mrs. Hillcrist in the 1931 sound version directed by Alfred Hitchcock.

Cast
 Edmund Gwenn - Hornblower
 Mary Clare - Chloe Hornblower
 Helen Haye - Mrs. Hillcrist
 Dawson Millward - Mr. Hillcrist
 Malcolm Keen - Charles Hillcrist
 Meggie Albanesi - Jill Hillcrist
 Frederick Cooper - Rolf Hornblower
 Ivor Barnard - Dawker
 Muriel Alexander - Anna
 James Dodd - Jackman
 John H. Roberts - Auctioneer
 Blanche Stanley - Mrs. Jackman
 Howard Cochran
 Marston Garsia - Hillcrist's Butler
 Jack Hobbs
 Charles Trevor - A Stranger

References

External links 
 

Films based on works by John Galsworthy
1921 films
British silent feature films
Dutch silent feature films
British black-and-white films
Dutch black-and-white films
1921 drama films
British drama films
Dutch drama films
1920s British films
Silent drama films